Josh Ranek (born May 11, 1978) is a former Canadian football player.

Ranek was a running back in the Canadian Football League for the Ottawa Renegades (2002–2005), the Hamilton Tiger-Cats (2006), the Edmonton Eskimos (preseason 2007), and the Saskatchewan Roughriders (November 2007).  In 2002, he attended the training camp of the Dallas Cowboys of the National Football League.  Ranek played college football at South Dakota State University.

A term was coined by Chris Walby, color commentator for the CFL broadcasts on CBC, called "Ring around the Ranek" to describe Ranek's power running, and his being an integral part to his team. Ranek won the "CFL Player of the Week" award on August 9, 2006 for a win over the Winnipeg Blue Bombers.

References

1978 births
Living people
People from Tyndall, South Dakota
Players of American football from South Dakota
American football running backs
American players of Canadian football
Canadian football running backs
Hamilton Tiger-Cats players
Ottawa Renegades players
Saskatchewan Roughriders players
South Dakota State Jackrabbits football players